

This is a list of the National Register of Historic Places listings in Sutter County, California.

This is intended to be a detailed list of the properties on the National Register of Historic Places in Sutter County, California, United States. Latitude and longitude coordinates are provided for many National Register properties and districts; these locations may be seen together in an online map.

There are 3 properties listed on the National Register in the county.

Current listings

|}

See also

List of National Historic Landmarks in California
National Register of Historic Places listings in California
California Historical Landmarks in Sutter County, California

References

Sutter